Rafail Borisovich Farbman (1893–1966) was a revolutionary Bolshevik and Soviet politician.

Biography 
Born in 1893 in Kursk, in to a Jewish family. Farbman was a member of RSDLP since 1910 at the age of 17. He conducted revolutionary activities in Kiev. In 1914 he was arrested and exiled to Tobolsk Governorate. After the February Revolution Farbman joined the Kiev committee of RSDLP becoming a chairman of Kiev Trade Unions and eventually a member of central committee of the Communist Party (bolsheviks) of Ukraine and the Central Executive Committee of Ukraine.

In 1919 as a member of Frontlines Bureau Farbman was in charge of the information and communication party department and a member of Orgbureau of the Communist Party of Ukraine. From January through March 1920 he acted as a secretary of the central committee in the absence of Stanislav Kosior. Later in 1920 Farbman moved to Moscow where he headed a city department of People's Education. He was a delegate at the 9th and 10th congresses of RSDLP(b). On December 18, 1927 Farbman was excluded from the Communist Party as a member of the United Opposition on a decision of the 15th Congress of the CPSU, but in 1932 he was reinstated. In 1930-35 Farbman worked as a deputy chief of the Trust Administration "Rudmetalltorg" (Metal-ore trade). In 1933 he was excluded from the party once again for Trotskyism and in 1935 he was arrested, receiving a life sentence. Farbman was freed only in 1956 and received an amnesty. He died in 1966.

References

External links
 Resolution of the 15th Congress of VKP(b) about the opposition of December 18, 1927 (Handbook on history of the Communist Party and the Soviet Union 1898–1991)
 brief information
 Rafail Farbman at Russian Jewish Encyclopedia
 Rafail Farbman at Handbook on history of the Communist Party and the Soviet Union 1898–1991

1893 births
1966 deaths
Politicians from Kursk
People from Kursky Uyezd
Russian Jews
Russian Social Democratic Labour Party members
Old Bolsheviks
Jewish Soviet politicians
First Secretaries of the Communist Party of Ukraine (Soviet Union)